Shahab Karami (born March 16, 1991) is an Iranian footballer who plays for Shahin Bushehr F.C.

Club career
In summer 2012 he participated in Paykan's pre-season trainings and signed a pre-contract. But after 2013 AFC U-22 Asian Cup qualification, he signed a two-year contract with Foolad. As summer 2014 he signed a three-year contract extension.

Club career statistics

International

Youth levels
He is invited to Iran U-22 by Alireza Mansourian to competing in 2013 AFC U-22 Asian Cup qualification.

Honours
Foolad
Persian Gulf Pro League (1): 2013–14

Persepolis
Persian Gulf Pro League (1): 2016–17
Iranian Super Cup: 2017

References

External links
 Shahab Karami at PersianLeague.com

 karami's Instagram- page

1991 births
Living people
Mes Sarcheshme players
Petrochimi Tabriz F.C. players
Foolad FC players
Iranian footballers
Sportspeople from Kermanshah
Association football midfielders